The Ground Mobility Vehicle (GMV) is a U.S. Special Operations Command, (US)SOCOM program, initially modifying Humvees into several variants for use by the United States special operations forces (SOF).

Its design is mostly based on lessons learned during Operation Desert Storm, after an initial program, post 1985, for specialized HMMWVs for desert strike operations: the Desert Mobility Vehicle (DMV), or "Dumvee". GMV crews like to call them "gun trunks".

The GMV program is superseded by the GMV 1.1, based on the General Dynamics Flyer 72. It is understood that under a seven-year indefinite delivery / indefinite-quantity (ID/IQ) contract (August 2013–August 2020), SOCOM wishes to procure 1,297 GMV 1.1s — to replace its 1,072 first generation, Humvee-based GMV units.

History 
The GMV was based on special forces Humvees that were developed based on American military deployed to the Middle East. The program was initially meant to provide equipment related to mountainous deployment.

Variants 
Early models were based on the M1025 Humvee chassis.  Later models of GMVs included versions based on the M1113 chassis.  Another model based on the M1165 HMMWV can be fitted with armor kits to create an 'up-armored' GMV with additional armor plating, ballistic glass and an optional gun shield around the top gunner's turret.

Variants consist of the following:
GMV-S – US Army Special Forces
GMV-R – 75th Ranger Regiment
GMV-N – Navy SEALs
GMV-T / GMV-SD / GMV-ST – Air Force Special Operations Command (AFSOC)
GMV-M – Marine Corps Special Operations Command (MARSOC)

Design 
GMVs feature an open rear, where an enclosed cabin would normally be. This flat bed area is used to store all the fuel, ammunition, rations and other supplies that the mission requires.

Each GMV can carry from 1 soldier to at least 10 in full combat gear and has room for enough fuel with other supplies to operate in desert areas for 10 days. The crew can modify the GMV to meet their specific needs.

Improvements 
The GMV program made changes in the Humvee's chassis and tires to make them more compatible for off-road work. The tires used were more rugged and have a central tire inflation system. Heavy suspension was also included as an upgrade, giving a ground clearance of 16.8 inch / 42.672 cm. There was an increased payload capacity to 2½ tons (unarmored M998 / M1025 GMVs) 

A V8 6.5L turbocharged diesel engine that ran at 190 horse power (142 kW) at 3,400 rpm was installed. Extra fuel tanks were available to improve on the GMV's range. Multiple M243 smoke grenade launchers are sometimes installed.

An open bed was used for improved storage and access with a winch for towing other vehicles (up to 4,200 pounds/1,905.088 kg). Armor plating was also available to better protect the vehicle and its occupants.

Replacement 

In June 2012, the United States Special Operations Command requested proposals for a replacement for the GMV, called GMV version 1.1.  By contrast to converted Humvees, the vehicle needed to be lighter, faster, more easily transportable by air, sea, and land, and contain next generation communications and computing equipment.  The vehicle was expected to be selected by the end of 2012, with production beginning in 2013. 1,300 of the new vehicles are to be in service by 2020. 

AM General, one of many contenders for the contract, pitched an upgraded GMV. In August 2013, General Dynamics was selected as the winner of the contract, potentially valued at $562 million.  The vehicle will replace 1,092 GMVs.

References

Bibliography

External Links 
 GMV Technical Manuals

Military trucks of the United States
Military vehicles introduced in the 1990s
Special operations commands of the United States Armed Forces
Post–Cold War armored fighting vehicles of the United States